"Becky's So Hot" is a song co-written and performed by American singer and songwriter Fletcher. It was released as the second single from her debut studio album Girl of My Dreams. As of September 2022, the song has peaked at number 31 on the US Billboard Hot Rock & Alternative Songs chart.

Music video

The official music video for "Becky's So Hot" was directed by Millicent Hailes.

Charts

References

2022 songs
2022 singles
Capitol Records singles
Fletcher (singer) songs
Lesbian-related songs
Song recordings produced by Malay (record producer)
Songs written by Fletcher (singer)
Songs written by Kinetics (rapper)
Songs written by One Love (record producer)